The COVID-19 pandemic in Chad is part of the ongoing worldwide pandemic of coronavirus disease 2019 caused by severe acute respiratory syndrome coronavirus 2. The virus was confirmed to have reached Chad in March 2020. As the third least developed nation in the world, according to the HDI in 2019, Chad has faced unique economic, social, and political challenges under the strain of the COVID-19 pandemic.

Background 
On 12 January 2020, the World Health Organization (WHO) confirmed that a novel coronavirus was the cause of a complex respiratory illness in a cluster of people in Wuhan City, Hubei Province, China, which was reported to the WHO on 31 December 2019.

The case fatality ratio for COVID-19 has been much lower than SARS of 2003, but the transmission has been significantly greater, with a significant total death toll. Model-based simulations for Chad indicate that the 95% confidence interval for the time-varying reproduction number R t for Chad fluctuated around 1.0 in late 2020 and early 2021. Studies on the ground have illustrated that the country is not adequately equipped to handle a pandemic. With roots tracing back to a violent and recent colonial history, many sectors of the Chadian economy and government are under-developed. Of specific concern regarding a global pandemic, the health sector faces many challenges in Chad. Issues such as geographic accessibility, government and foreign-aid funding conflicts, brain drain emigration, and poor infrastructure shape the scope of care systems. Understanding the context of the Chadian health sector, pre-pandemic, helps to set a foundational understanding for the struggles the nation now faces and paths for the future.

Timeline

2020

March 
 On 19 March, Chadian authorities reported their first case, a Moroccan passenger who flew from Douala.

 On 26 March, with three cases already reported, Chadian authorities reported two additional positive cases. The cases were a 48-year-old Chadian and a 55-year-old Cameroonian passenger on a 17 March Ethiopian Airlines flight from Dubai and Brussels, respectively, via Addis Ababa.

 On 30 March, two more cases of COVID-19 were reported, a Chadian citizen from Douala and a Swiss citizen from Brussels.

 In total in March, 7 cases were confirmed with no deaths. As there were no recoveries in March, the number of active cases at the end of the month was 7.

April 
 On 2 April, Chad registered a new case of COVID-19, a Chadian who traveled from Dubai via Abuja.

 On 3 April, a new case of COVID-19 was registered, a French citizen who traveled from Brussels via Paris.

 On 6 April, Chad recorded its first case of local contamination, a 31-year-old Chadian who was in contact with another Chadian who had diagnosed positive.

 On 9 April, health officials reported a new case of virus infection, a 59-year-old Chadian who arrived on March 25 in N'Djamena. The man was returning from Pakistan, via Cameroon, having reached N'Djamena by land. The man continued his journey to Abéché where he was finally quarantined on 4 April. The test was declared positive on 8 April.

 During April there were 66 new cases, bringing the total number of confirmed cases to 73. Two deaths were reported on 28 April and three more on 30 April, bringing the total death toll to five. 33 patients recovered, leaving 35 active cases at the end of the month.

May
 In May there were 705 new cases, bringing the total number of confirmed cases to 778. The death toll rose to 65. There were 458 new recoveries, raising the total number of recovered patients to 491. At the end of the month there were 222 patients representing active cases.

June
 During June there were 88 new cases, bringing the total number of confirmed cases to 866. The death toll rose by 9 to 74. There were 290 more recoveries, bringing the total number of recovered patients to 781. At the end of June there were 11 active cases.

July to December
 There were 70 new cases in July, 77 in August, 180 in September, 306 in October, 189 in November, and 425 in December. The total number of cases stood at 936 in July, 1013 in August, 1193 in September, 1499 in October, 1688 in November, and 2113 in December.

 The number of recovered patients stood at 813 in July, 880 in August, 1007 in September, 1330 in October, 1525 in November, and 1704 in December, leaving 48 active cases at the end of July, 56 at the end of August, 101 at the end of September, 71 at the end of October, 62 at the end of November, and 305 at the end of December.

 The death toll rose to 75 in July, 77 in August, 85 in September, 98 in October, 101 in November, and 104 in December.

January to December 2021 
 On 1 January, Chad locked down its capital N'djamena in response to rising infections. The country banned gatherings of over 10 people, limited its airspace to cargo flights only, and shut down schools, universities, places of worship, bars, restaurants and non-essential public services.

 Vaccinations started on 4 June, initially with 200,000 doses of the Sinopharm BIBP vaccine donated by China.

 There were 1263 new cases in January, 610 in February, 566 in March, 272 in April, 107 in May, 20 in June, 22 in July, 19 in August, 47 in September, 66 in October, 596 in November, and 482 in December. The total number of cases stood at 3376 in January, 3986 in February, 4552 in March, 4824 in April, 4931 in May, 4951 in June, 4973 in July, 4992 in August, 5039 in September, 5105 in October, 5701 in November, and 6183 in December.

 The number of recovered patients stood at 2464 in January, 3480 in February, 4149 in March, 4423 in April, 4746 in May, 4769 in June, 4793 in July, 4810 in August, 4857 in September, and 4913 in October, leaving 794 active cases at the end of January, 366 at the end of February, 239 at the end of March, 231 at the end of April, 12 at the end of May, 8 at the end of June, 6 at the end of July, 8 at the end of August, 8 at the end of September, and 17 at the end of October.

 The death toll rose to 118 in January, 140 in February, 164 in March, 170 in April, 173 in May, 174 in June, 175 in October, 181 in November, and 184 in December.

 Modelling carried out by the Regional Office for Africa of the World Health Organization suggests that due to underreporting, the true number of cases by the end of 2021 was around 7.2 million while the true number of COVID-19 deaths was around 9900.

January to December 2022 
 There were 972 new cases in January, 100 in February, 92 in March, 64 in April, 6 in May, 8 in June, 12 in July, 101 in August, 52 in September, 37 in October, 19 in November, and 5 in December. The total number of cases stood at 7155 in January, 7255 in February, 7347 in March, 7411 in April, 7417 in May, 7425 in June, 7437 in July, 7538 in August, 7590 in September, 7627 in October, 7646 in November, and 7651 in December.

 The death toll rose to 190 in January, 192 in March, 193 in April, and 194 in October.

January to December 2023 
 There was one more case in January and 26 in February, taking the total number of cases to 7652 in January  and 7678 in February.

Statistics

Confirmed new cases per day

Confirmed deaths per day

Response 
As a preventive measure, the government cancelled all flights into the country, except for cargo flights. Furthermore, the government responded with similar and standard global practices of mandating mask wearing in public spaces, creating a curfew from 8 pm to 5 am, checking temperatures at airports and supporting "quarantine hotels", as well raising public awareness of the viral threat through campaigns and advertisements. Schools, public life such as bars and social clubs, and government work was closed along with social distancing requirements. Of importance to note is the paradox of low corona virus cases in Chad given the strained health systems in place. Researchers have theorized that these low numbers may have a multitude of answers: notably the population's previous exposure and experience with infectious disease, as well the average age of the population, 52.8 years, being under the highest levels of "at-risk ages" for the COVID-19 pandemic, around 65 years old and poor records and/or testing of cases. The IMF details responses the Chadian government has worked to implement such as subsidizing the agricultural sector, tax break plans, focusing on essential imports such as food distribution, suspending household bills, and clearing domestic debt. Of importance to track in response to the pandemic is Chad's increasing ties with China. China has a relationship with the nation through generous loan programs, and throughout the pandemic these ties have increased as China has stepped up to provide food distribution aid as well as medical equipment and support in zones of active violence in Chad.

See also 
 COVID-19 pandemic in Africa
 COVID-19 pandemic by country and territory

References

External links